The  Oakland Raiders season was the franchise's 44th season in the National Football League, the 54th overall and the second under head coach Dennis Allen. With a 4–12 record, the Raiders secured their eleventh consecutive non-winning season, and missed the playoffs for an eleventh consecutive season. The Raiders entered the season with a new quarterback in Terrelle Pryor. Pryor started off the season in impressive fashion, with the team almost pulling off the upset in Week 1 against the Indianapolis Colts, and defeating the Jacksonville Jaguars in Week 2. The team and Pryor eventually cooled down, resulting in Pryor being benched for Matt McGloin in the game against the Houston Texans. Before this game, history was made in the game against the Philadelphia Eagles when Eagles quarterback Nick Foles threw 7 touchdown passes, the most passing touchdowns the Raiders had ever allowed in its history. Prior to the season starting, the Raiders brought back defensive back Charles Woodson, who spent the last 7 years with the Green Bay Packers.

2013 draft class

Notes
 The Raiders traded their first-round selection (No. 3 overall) to the Miami Dolphins in exchange for the Dolphins' first- (No. 12 overall) and second- (No. 42 overall) round selections.
 The Raiders traded their original second-round selection (No. 37 overall) to the Cincinnati Bengals in exchange for quarterback Carson Palmer.
 The Raiders traded their fourth-round selection (No. 100 overall) to the Tampa Bay Buccaneers in exchange for the Buccaneers' fourth- (No. 112 overall) and sixth- (No. 181) round selections.
 The Raiders acquired an additional sixth-round selection — No. 176 overall, along with a conditional 2014 selection in a trade that sent quarterback Carson Palmer and one of their seventh-round selections (No. 219 overall; previously acquired in a trade that sent wide receiver Louis Murphy to the Carolina Panthers) to the Arizona Cardinals. The Raiders later traded the No. 176 selection to the Houston Texans in exchange for the Texans' sixth (No. 184 overall) and seventh- (No. 233 overall) round selections.
 Compensatory selection.
The Raiders did not have a selection in the fifth round, as they traded their fifth-round selection (No. 138 overall) to the Seattle Seahawks in exchange for linebacker Aaron Curry.

Staff

Final roster

Schedule

Preseason

Regular season

Note: Intra-division opponents are in bold text.

Game summaries

Week 1: at Indianapolis Colts

Week 2: vs. Jacksonville Jaguars

Week 3: at Denver Broncos

Week 4: vs. Washington Redskins

Week 5: vs. San Diego Chargers

This game was moved to an 8:35 p.m. PDT kickoff, and from CBS to NFL Network as a "special edition" of Thursday Night Football, as extended time was required to convert the field back from its baseball configuration due to an Oakland Athletics American League Division Series game the previous night.

Week 6: at Kansas City Chiefs

Week 8: vs. Pittsburgh Steelers

Week 9: vs. Philadelphia Eagles

Week 10: at New York Giants

Week 11: at Houston Texans

Week 12: vs. Tennessee Titans

Week 13: at Dallas Cowboys
Thanksgiving Day game

Week 14: at New York Jets

Week 15: vs. Kansas City Chiefs

Week 16: at San Diego Chargers

Week 17: vs. Denver Broncos

Standings

Division

Conference

References

External links

Oakland Raiders seasons
R00
Oakland
Oakland